Sucha or Suchá may refer to:

Places

Czech Republic
Suchá, a municipality and village in the Vysočina Region
Suchá, a village and part of Havlíčkův Brod in the Vysočina Region
Suchá, a village and part of Hlavňovice in the Plzeň Region
Suchá, a village and part of Jáchymov in the Karlovy Vary Region
Suchá, a village and part of Nechanice in the Hradec Králové Region
Suchá, a village and part of Nejdek in the Karlovy Vary Region
Suchá, a village and part of Litomyšl in the Pardubice Region
Suchá, a village and part of Stebno in the Ústí nad Labem Region

Poland
Sucha, Kuyavian-Pomeranian Voivodeship (north-central Poland)
Sucha Beskidzka in Lesser Poland Voivodeship (south Poland)
Sucha, Łódź Voivodeship (central Poland)
Sucha, Białobrzegi County in Masovian Voivodeship (east-central Poland)
Sucha, Radom County in Masovian Voivodeship (east-central Poland)
Sucha, Greater Poland Voivodeship (west-central Poland)
Sucha, Lubusz Voivodeship (west Poland)
Sucha, Opole Voivodeship (south-west Poland)
Sucha, Pomeranian Voivodeship (north Poland)
Sucha, Warmian-Masurian Voivodeship (north Poland)
Sucha, Myślibórz County in West Pomeranian Voivodeship (north-west Poland)
Sucha, Szczecinek County in West Pomeranian Voivodeship (north-west Poland)
Sucha, Świdwin County in West Pomeranian Voivodeship (north-west Poland)

People
Graham Sucha, Canadian politician 
Růžena Suchá, Czech chess master